Emperor Daowu of Northern Wei (4 August 371 – 6 November 409), personal name Tuoba Gui, né Tuoba Shegui, was the founding emperor of the Northern Wei.  He was the grandson of the last prince of Dai, Tuoba Shiyijian. After the fall of the Dai state to Former Qin in 376, he was presumed to be the eventual successor to the Dai throne.  After Former Qin fell into disarray in 383 following its defeat by Jin forces at the Battle of Fei River, Tuoba Gui took the opportunity to reestablish Dai in 386. He soon changed the state's name to Wei and declared himself a prince.  He was initially a vassal of Later Yan, but after defeating Later Yan emperor Murong Bao in 397 and seizing most of Later Yan's territory, he claimed the imperial title in 398.

Emperor Daowu was commonly regarded as a brilliant general, but cruel and arbitrary in his rule, particularly toward the end of his reign.  In 409, as he considered killing his concubine Consort Helan, his son Tuoba Shao the Prince of Qinghe, by Consort Helan, killed him, but was soon defeated by the crown prince Tuoba Si, who then took the throne as Emperor Mingyuan.

Life before founding of Northern Wei

Birth and childhood 
According to official accounts, Tuoba Gui was born in 371, after his father Tuoba Shi, the son and heir apparent to Tuoba Shiyijian the Prince of Dai, died earlier in the year from an injury he suffered while protecting Tuoba Shiyijian from an assassination attempt by the general Baba Jin.  His mother was Tuoba Shi's wife Heiress Apparent Helan, the daughter of the powerful tribal chief and Dai vassal Helian Yegan.  Tuoba Shiyijian, while mourning his son's death, was very pleased by the grandson's birth, and he declared a general pardon in his state and named the child Tuoba Shegui.  (Other than the reference to the naming at birth, however, the name "Shegui" was scantily mentioned in historical accounts of the rest of his life, and presumably was shortened to "Gui" for simplicity.)

Around New Years 377, Former Qin launched a major attack against Dai.  Tuoba Shiyijian temporarily fled his capital Yunzhong (雲中, in modern Hohhot, Inner Mongolia), but returned after Former Qin retreated.  After his return, however, his nephew Tuoba Jin convinced his oldest surviving son Tuoba Shijun that Tuoba Shiyijian was considering naming one of the sons of his wife Princess Murong (a Former Yan princess) as heir and killing him. In response, Tuoba Shijun ambushed his father and brothers and killed them.  This led to a collapse of Dai forces, and Former Qin forces occupied Yunzhong without a fight.

In the disturbance, Tuoba Gui's mother Lady Helan initially fled to her brother Helan Na, who had taken over as tribal chief after Helan Yegan's death.  Later, the Former Qin emperor Fu Jiān considered taking Tuoba Gui to the Former Qin capital Chang'an, but Tuoba Shiyijian's secretary Yan Feng convinced Fu Jiān to instead allow Tuoba Gui to remain in Dai lands to be groomed as the eventual Dai prince, arguing that this would be the best way to maintain the tribes' allegiance to Former Qin.  Meanwhile, Fu Jiān divided the Dai tribes into two groups, commanded by the Xiongnu chiefs Liu Kuren and Liu Weichen.  Tuoba Gui, along with his mother, went to live with Liu Kuren, who honored the child as a prince.

Adolescence 
Little is known about Tuoba Gui's life until 385, by which time Former Qin, which had come close to uniting all of China, had fallen into great disturbance in light of rebellions throughout the empire.  In 384, Liu Kuren had attempted to aid Fu Jiān's son Fu Pi, who was then under siege by Murong Chui, the founder of Later Yan, but was assassinated by Muyu Chang, the son of a Later Yan noble; he was succeeded by his brother Liu Toujuan.  In 385, however, Liu Toujuan was assassinated by Liu Kuren's son Liu Xian, who took over as chief and viewed Tuoba Gui, now 14, as a threat.  However, his subordinates Balie Liujuan and Qiumuling Chong found out, and at Balie's instruction Qiumuling escorted Tuoba Gui to his uncle Helan Na, who put Tuoba Gui under his protection.  In 386, at the urging of previous Dai officials, Helan Na supported Tuoba Gui in reassuming the title of Prince of Dai.

Alternative version 
However, an alternative version of Tuoba Gui's early life was presented in documents such as the Book of Jin and Book of Song—the official histories of the rival Jin Dynasty (266–420) and Liu Song Dynasty, which obviously had a motive to be biased, and yet presented interesting issues.  Under this version, Tuoba Gui was not Tuoba Shiyijian's grandson, but his son—and was born significantly earlier than the official 371 date, of Tuoba Shiyijian's wife Princess Murong.  When Former Qin attacked in 377, it was Tuoba Gui who restrained his father Tuoba Shiyijian and surrendered.  Fu Jiān, offended at this act of betrayal, exiled Tuoba Gui.  When Murong Chui, his uncle, declared Later Yan in 384, Tuoba Gui joined him, and was later put in charge of his father's tribes through a military campaign waged by Later Yan.  Then, later, in order to avoid having the people know Tuoba Gui's status as a traitor to his father, the official version of his personal history was manufactured.

This version is not well attested but would solve a number of apparent contradictions in early Northern Wei history.  These difficulties apparent in the official version include:

 How Tuoba Gui's father, Tuoba Shi, had a nearly identical name to the perpetrator of the patricide, Tuoba Shijun.  If both names were manufactured by Tuoba Gui's later apologists, then the similarity in name could be explained as lack of creativity.
 How Tuoba Han, mentioned as Tuoba Shi's younger brother, was also referred to in some official sources as Tuoba Gui's younger brother; as Tuoba Yi, Tuoba Han's son, played an important role early in Northern Wei history as a key diplomat and general, he would be too old to be possibly Tuoba Gui's nephew if Tuoba Gui were born in 371.  Obviously, if the official history, which stated that Tuoba Yi was Tuoba Gui's cousin, were correct, then there is no problem.
 How Tuoba Gui appeared too willing to turn against his maternal uncles the Helans early in his reign.  If he was actually the son of Princess Murong, then he would not be related to the Helans, and his campaigns against them seemed less problematic.  (Of course, it would then render it problematic how he eventually attacked and seized most of Later Yan's history, as the Later Yan emperor Murong Bao would be his cousin.)
 How Tuoba Gui could have a younger brother—as given and undisputed in official history—Tuoba Gu -- described as also being a son of his mother Lady Helan, if he himself were born after Tuoba Shi's death.  (Two alternative explanations exist, however—it could be that Tuoba Gu was actually born of a concubine of Tuoba Shi but raised by Lady Helan, or it could be that Lady Helan remarried after Tuoba Shi's death, to another member of the Tuoba clan—possibly Tuoba Yi's father Tuoba Han—and therefore her younger son Tuoba Gu would also carry the Tuoba name.  The latter possibility is attested in that another semi-contradictory version of the official history stated that Tuoba Gu was Tuoba Yi's younger brother.  Another possible explanation—that Tuoba Gu was a twin younger brother—appears unlikely, as the official accounts of Tuoba Gui's birth did not suggest the possibility of twin birth.)
 How Tuoba Gui's oldest son Tuoba Si, born in 392, was said to be a late-arriving son.  According to the official chronology, Tuoba Gui would only be 21 at this point, and it might be difficult to comprehend his being characterized as having had a late fatherhood.  On the other hand, during his lifetime, particularly among non-Han peoples, marriage and childbirth often happened during adolescence.
 How Tuoba Gui appeared to begin to show signs of mental deterioration when he was still just in his late 30s, with signs of paranoia that appeared to be more characteristic of men of much older age.  The official version attribute this to poisoning from powders given him by alchemists, which is not an unreasonable explanation, however, or it also could have been that the paranoia had nothing to do with mental deterioration.

Whether Cui Hao, the prime minister of Tuoba Gui's grandson Emperor Taiwu of Northern Wei, propagated this version, and whether that contributed to Emperor Taiwu's execution of not only himself but his entire clan, is not completely clear, but appeared likely.

As Prince of Wei

Establishment of rule 
For the first several years of his reign, Tuoba Gui had to endure constant gravitating of positions by tribal chiefs, and his position was not secure.  As he gradually asserted his leadership, however, the tribal chiefs began to coalesce around him.

In spring 386, Tuoba Gui set his capital at Shengle (盛樂, in modern Hohhot, Inner Mongolia), and was said to encourage agriculture to try to rest his people.  In summer 386, he changed his title to Prince of Wei (and thus the state became known in history as Northern Wei).

In fall 386, with support of Western Yan and Liu Xian, Tuoba Gui's youngest uncle Tuoba Kuduo made a claim to the throne, and there were many chiefs under Tuoba Gui who secretly conspired with Tuoba Kuduo, causing Tuoba Gui to panic to flee to his maternal uncles' Helan tribe, while seeking assistance from Later Yan.  Later Yan's emperor Murong Chui sent his son Murong Lin to assist, and together they defeated Tuoba Kuduo, who fled to and was executed by Liu Weichen.

Around the new year 387, Murong Chui offered the titles of Western Chanyu and Prince of Shanggu to Tuoba Gui, but as the title of Prince of Shanggu was not as honored of one as Prince of Wei, Tuoba Gui refused them.

Despite Later Yan's assistance of him and his status as a Later Yan vassal, Tuoba Gui began to secretly consider whether he could eventually conquer Later Yan.  In 388, he sent his cousin Tuoba Yi the Duke of Jiuyuan to offer tributes to Murong Chui but also to observe the Later Yan court, to consider whether he would have eventual chance of attacking it.  Murong Yi concluded that Murong Chui was growing old, and that his crown prince Murong Bao was incompetent—and that there were many potential claimants who would weaken Later Yan.  This encouraged Tuoba Gui greatly in his eventual planning.

In 391, Helan Na's brother Helan Rangan plotted to kill Helan Na, and the brothers engaged in wars against each other.  Tuoba Gui took this opportunity to request Later Yan to jointly attack the Helan tribe—notwithstanding Helan Na and Helan Rangan's status as his uncles.  In summer 391, Murong Lin captured Helan Na and Helan Rangan, but allowed Helan Na to remain free and be in command of his tribe, while taking Helan Rangan as a prisoner.  It was after this campaign that Murong Lin, seeing Tuoba Gui's abilities, suggested to Murong Chui that Tuoba Gui be detained.  Murong Chui refused.

In fall 391, an incident occurred that would lead to the break of relations between Later Yan and Northern Wei. That year, Tuoba Gui sent his brother Tuoba Gu to Later Yan to offer tribute, and Murong Chui's sons detained Tuoba Gu and ordered Tuoba Gui to offer horses to trade for Tuoba Gu's freedom. Tuoba Gui refused and broke off relations with Later Yan, instead entering into an alliance with Western Yan.

Following hostility with Later Yan 

In 391, Tuoba Gui attacked Rouran—which had been a Dai vassal but had never submitted to him—inflicting major damage on Rouran, but was unable to destroy it.  Rouran would remain an annoyance, and often a menace, for the rest of Northern Wei's history.

In winter 391, Liu Wenchen sent his son Liu Zhilidi to attack Northern Wei, and Tuoba Gui, despite having a much smaller army than Liu Zhilidi, defeated him, and further crossed the Yellow River to attack Liu Wenchen's capital Yueba (悅拔, in modern Ordos, Inner Mongolia), capturing it, forcing Liu Wenchen and Liu Zhilidi to flee.  The next day, Liu Wenchen was killed by his subordinates, and Liu Zhilidi was captured.  Tuoba Gui annexed Liu Wenchen's territory and people into his own, and slaughtered Liu Wenchen's clan and associates—more than 5,000 people.  Liu Wenchen's youngest son Liu Bobo, however, fled to the Xuegan tribe, whose chief Tai Xifu refused to turn him over despite Northern Wei demands, and Liu Bobo would eventually marry the daughter of Later Qin's vassal Mo Yigan and became dependent on him.  To punish Tai Xifu, Tuoba Gui attacked him in 393 and slaughtered much of his tribe, although Tai Xifu himself fled.

In 394, Western Yan's emperor Murong Yong, under heavy attack by Murong Chui, sought aid from Tuoba Gui, but Tuoba Gui, while sending an army by his cousin Tuoba Qian the Duke of Chenliu and the general Yu Yue to distantly try to distract Later Yan, Northern Wei forces never actually engaged Later Yan, and Murong Yong was captured and killed later that year when his capital Zhangzi (長子, in modern Changzhi, Shanxi) fell, and Western Yan was annexed into Later Yan.

In 395, Tuoba Gui led raids against Later Yan's border regions.  Later that year, Murong Chui commissioned an 80,000-men army led by Murong Bao, assisted by his brothers Murong Nong and Murong Lin, to try punish Northern Wei.  Tuoba Gui, hearing about Murong Bao's army, abandoned Shengle and retreated west across the Yellow River.  Murong Bao's army quickly reached the river in fall 395 and prepared to cross the river.  However, by this point, Northern Wei scouts had cut off the line of communication between Murong Bao's army and the Later Yan capital Zhongshan (中山, in modern Baoding, Hebei), and Northern Wei had the captured Later Yan messengers declare that Murong Chui had already died, causing great disturbance in the Later Yan army.  The Later Yan and Northern Wei forces stalemated across the Yellow River for 20 odd days, when Murong Lin's followers tried to start a coup and support Murong Lin as new leader, and while the coup failed, uncertainty fell on Later Yan forces.  As winter came, Later Yan forces retreated and, not realizing that the Yellow River would freeze to allow Northern Wei forces to cross easily, Murong Bao left no rearguard as he retreated.  Tuoba Gui personally gave chase, catching Later Yan forces unprepared at the Battle of Canhe Slope, killing or capturing nearly the entire Later Yan army, and only Murong Bao and a number of officers escaped. Tuoba Gui, fearful of the Later Yan captives, slaughtered them at the suggestion of his brother-in-law Kepin Jian.

In 396, concerned that Northern Wei would then view Murong Bao lightly, Murong Chui personally led another expedition against Northern Wei, initially successful and killing Tuoba Qian.  Tuoba Gui became concerned and considered abandoning Shengle again.  However, as the army reached Canhe Slope, the soldiers cried out loud for their fathers and brothers, and Murong Chui became angry and ill, forcing the Later Yan forces to retreat to Zhongshan.  He soon died, and Murong Bao succeeded him as emperor.

In fall 396, Tuoba Gui led his Northern Wei troops and made a surprise attack on Bing Province (并州, modern central and northern Shanxi), defeating Murong Nong and forcing him to flee back to Zhongshan.  Tuoba Gui then advanced east, ready to attack Zhongshan.  Accepting Murong Lin's suggestion, Murong Bao prepared to defend Zhongshan, leaving the Northern Wei forces free to roam over his territory, believing that Northern Wei would retreat once its forces are worn out.  However, this had the effect that all of the cities' garrisons in modern Hebei abandoned them, except for Zhongshan and two other important cities—Yecheng (in modern Handan, Hebei) and Xindu (信都, in modern Hengshui, Hebei).  After making an initial attack against Zhongshan and failing, Tuoba Gui changed his tactic to establishing his rule over the other cities while leaving Zhongshan alone.  In spring 397, Xindu fell.  Meanwhile, however, Tuoba Gui had received news of a rebellion near his capital Shengle and offered peace—which Murong Bao rejected, and Murong Bao attacked Northern Wei forces as Tuoba Gui prepared to retreat, but instead was defeated by Tuoba Gui at great loss.  At this time, concerned about a coup attempt by Murong Lin, Murong Bao abandoned Zhongshan and fled to the old Former Yan capital Longcheng (龍城, in modern Jinzhou, Hebei).  However, the remaining garrison at Zhongshan supported Murong Bao's nephew Murong Xiang the Duke of Kaifeng as their leader, and Tuoba Gui was unable to take Zhongshan immediately.  Realizing that he had alienated the Later Yan people by having slaughtered the captives at Canhe Slope, Tuoba Gui changed his policy and tried to be gentle with the conquered Later Yan territory, and while time would be required, the territories began to abide by his rule.

Murong Xiang, meanwhile, declared himself emperor, and put Tuoba Gu to death to try to show his resolve.  In the fall, however, Murong Lin made a surprise attack on him, killing him and taking over Zhongshan.  Murong Lin also claimed imperial title, but was unable to stand Northern Wei military pressure, and Zhongshan fell to Tuoba Gui, who was largely gentle to Zhongshan's population despite their resistance—although he slaughtered the clans of those who advocated Tuoba Gu's death.  It was around this time, however, that his army suffered a serious plague that might have killed as much as half of the army and livestock.  When his generals tried to persuade him to suspend the campaign, Tuoba Gui gave a response that might be quite demonstrative of his personality:

This is the will of Heaven, and I can do nothing about it.  A state can be established anywhere on earth where there are people.  It only depends on how I govern it, and I am not fearful that the people would die.

Around the new year 398, with Tuoba Gui ready to attack Yecheng, Yecheng's defender Murong De abandoned it and fled south of the Yellow River, to Huatai (滑台, in modern Anyang, Henan), where he declared an independent Southern Yan state.  With resistance north of the Yellow River largely gone, Tuoba Gui left Tuoba Yi and Suhe Ba as viceroys over the former Later Yan territory, and returned to Shengle.  In order to enhance communications and control, Tuoba Gui constructed a highway between Wangdu (望都, in modern Baoding, Hebei) and Dai (代, in modern Zhangjiakou, Hebei), over the Taihang Mountains.  He soon, however, recalled Tuoba Yi to be his prime minister and replaced him with his cousin Tuoba Zun the Duke of Lueyang.

In summer 398, Tuoba Gui considered restoring the old name of the state, Dai, but at the suggestion of Cui Hong, he kept the name Wei.  He moved the capital from Shengle south to Pingcheng (平城, in modern Datong, Shanxi), to be in greater proximity with the conquered territories.  He also issued edicts to standardize weights and measures throughout the state, and to establish standard ceremonies based on Chinese and Xianbei traditions.

Around the new year 399, Tuoba Gui declared himself emperor.  He also claimed descent from the mystical Yellow Emperor, to legitimize his reign over the Han.

Early reign as emperor 
In 399, Emperor Daowu made a major attack on the Gaoche tribes near and in the Gobi Desert, inflicting great casualties and capturing many Gaoche tribesmen.  In a display of cruelty and power, he ordered the captured Gaoche men to use their bodies as a wall on a hunt he carried out months later, to stop animals from escape.  He also had the Gaoche slaves build a deer farm for him.

Later that year, he reorganized his government, expanding from 36 bureaus to 360 bureaus, and he also established a university at Pingcheng and ordered that books be collected throughout the empire and be delivered to Pingcheng.

In summer 399, the Southern Yan general Li Bian surrendered the Southern Yan capital Huatai to Northern Wei, forcing the Southern Yan emperor Murong De to instead attack Jin and take over its Qing Province (青州, modern central and eastern Shandong) as his territory.

Later in 399, because Emperor Daowu was angry that, on a letter to Jin's general Chi Hui, the official Cui Cheng insufficiently deprecated the status of Emperor An of Jin (and also because he had been offended by a previous remark made by Cui in which he thought Cui compared him to an owl), he ordered Cui to commit suicide.  This incident caused Emperor Daowu's reputation among the states to suffer, as for the next few years, some important Jin officials who lost out in Jin civil wars declined to flee to him for refuge because of the incident.

In 400, Emperor Daowu considered creating an empress.  Of his consorts, he most favored Consort Liu, the daughter of Liu Toujuan, who bore his oldest son Tuoba Si.  However, according to Tuoba tribe customs, he was required to make the potential candidates try to forge golden statues, to try to discern divine favor.  Consort Liu was unable to complete her statue, while Consort Murong, the youngest daughter of Murong Bao, whom he captured when he took Zhongshan in 397, was able to complete her statue, and so Emperor Daowu created her empress.

Around this time, Emperor Daowu became increasingly superstitious and became trusting of astrologers and alchemists, seeking immortality.  He also began to use strict laws against his subordinates, punishing them harshly if they carried out what he perceived to be disrespectful actions.

In 401-402, Emperor Daowu made an attempt to attack Later Yan, by now limited to modern Liaoning, but was unable to make gains against Later Yan's emperor Murong Sheng.

Around this time, Emperor Daowu also sought marriage and peace with Later Qin.  However, Later Qin's emperor Yao Xing, hearing that he already had Empress Murong, refused, and because around this time Emperor Daowu constantly attacked several Later Qin vassals, the states' relations broke down.  Emperor Daowu therefore began to prepare for a confrontation with Later Qin.  Later in the year, Yao Xing did make a major attack against Northern Wei.  In fall 402, Yao Xing's forward commander Yao Ping the Duke of Yiyang was surrounded by Northern Wei's Emperor Daowu at Chaibi (柴壁, in modern Linfen, Shanxi), and despite counterattacks by both Yao Ping and Yao Xing, the Northern Wei siege became increasingly tighter, and in winter 402, Yao Ping and his army were captured following a failed attempt to break out, ending Yao Xing's campaign against Northern Wei.

Late reign 
In the last few years of Emperor Daowu's reign, he became increasingly harsher in his treatment of his officials.  For example, in 406, as he planned the expansion of Pingcheng with intent to make it into an impressive capital, he initially had his official Mo Ti, an accomplished civil engineer, plan the city's layout, but over a relatively minor issue where Mo was not very careful, ordered Mo to commit suicide—and then used Mo's layout anyway.  He also made increasing visits to Chaishan Palace (豺山宮, in modern Shuozhou, Shanxi), often spending months there at a stretch.  Other key officials that he killed during this period included his cousin Tuoba Zun the Prince of Changshan, Yu Yue, Monalou Ti, and Tuoba Yi the Prince of Wei.

In 407, Northern Wei and Later Qin entered into a peace treaty, returning previously captured generals to each other.  This would have a disastrous consequence on Later Qin, however, as Liu Bobo, then a Later Qin general, became angry because his father Liu Weichen had been killed by Northern Wei, and therefore rebelled, establishing his own state Xia.  However, he spent much more of his energy conducting guerilla warfare against Later Qin, gradually sapping Later Qin's strength, and did not actually conduct warfare against Northern Wei.

By 409, Emperor Daowu, who was said to be under the effect of poisonous substances given him by alchemists, was described to be so harsh and paranoid in his personality that he constantly feared rebellion, particularly because fortunetellers had been telling him that a rebellion would happen near him.  He occasionally would not eat for days, or would not sleep overnight.  He often mumbled about his past accomplishments or defeats, and he suspected all of his officials.  Sometimes when officials made reports to him, he would suddenly think of their past faults and punish or even kill them.  Occasionally, when others would behave even slightly inappropriately, he would be so angry that he would kill them personally and display their bodies outside the palace.  The entire government came under a spell of terror.  The only persons immune from this treatment were said to be the minister Cui Hong and his son Cui Hao, who were said to avoid the disaster by never offending or flattering the emperor—both of which could have brought disaster.

In fall 409, Emperor Daowu resolved to create Tuoba Si crown prince.  Because of the Tuoba traditional custom of executing the designated heir's mother, he ordered Tuoba Si's mother Consort Liu to commit suicide.  He explained his reasons to Crown Prince Si, who, however, could not stop mourning for his mother, and Emperor Daowu became very angry, and he summoned the crown prince.  Crown Prince Si, in fear, fled out of Pingcheng.

At this time, however, Emperor Daowu would suffer death at another son's hand.  When he was young, when he had visited Helan tribe, he saw his maternal aunt (Princess Dowager Helan's sister), who was very beautiful, and he asked to have her as a concubine.  Princess Dowager Helan refused—but not under the rationale that it would be incest, but rather that the younger Lady Helan had already had a husband and was too beautiful—citing a saying that beautiful things were often poisonous.  Without Princess Dowager Helan's knowledge, he assassinated the younger Lady Helan's husband and took her as a concubine, and in 394 she bore him a son, Tuoba Shao, whom he later created the Prince of Qinghe.  Tuoba Shao was said to be a reckless teenager, who often visited the streets in commoner disguises, and often robbed travelers and strip them naked for fun.  When Emperor Daowu heard this, he punished Tuoba Shao by hanging him upside down in a well, only pulling him out as he neared death.  In fall 409, Emperor Daowu had an argument with Consort Helan, and he imprisoned her and planned to execute her, but it was dusk at the time, and he hesitated.  Consort Helan secretly sent a messenger to Tuoba Shao, asking him to save her.  At night, Tuoba Shao, then 15, entered the palace and killed Emperor Daowu.  The next day, however, the imperial guards arrested and killed Tuoba Shao and Consort Helan, and Tuoba Si took the throne as Emperor Mingyuan.

Family
Consorts and Issue:
 Empress Daowu, of the Murong clan, second cousin
 Empress Xuanmu, of the Liu clan (d. 409)
 Princess Huayin
 Married Ji Ba, Prince Changle, and had issue (one son)
 Tuoba Si, Emperor Mingyuan (392–423), first son
 Furen, of the He clan (d. 409), aunt
 Tuoba Shao, Prince Qinghe (394–409), second son
 Furen, of the Wang clan
 Tuoba Xi, Prince Yangping (399–421)
 Furen, of the Wang clan
 Tuoba Yao, Prince Henan (401–422)
 Furen, of the Duan clan
 Tuoba Lian, Prince Guangping (d. 426), seventh son
 Tuoba Li, Prince Jingzhao (d. 428), eighth son
 Unknown
 Tuoba Xiu, Prince Hejian (d. 416), fifth son
 Tuoba Chuwen, Prince Changle (403–416), sixth son
 Tuoba Cong
 Princess Huoze
 Married Lü Dafei, Prince Zhongshan, a son of Yujiulü Datan, and had issue (one son)

Ancestry

References

 Book of Wei, vol. 2.
 History of Northern Dynasties, vol. 1.
 Book of Jin, vols. 113, 114.
 Book of Song, vol. 95.
 Zizhi Tongjian, vols. 104, 106, 107, 108, 109, 110, 111, 112, 113, 114, 115.

|- style="text-align: center;"

|-

|-

|-

|-

371 births
409 deaths
4th-century Chinese monarchs
5th-century Chinese monarchs
5th-century murdered monarchs
Northern Wei emperors
Former Qin people
Later Yan people
Murdered Chinese emperors
Patricides
People murdered in China
People from Baoding
Founding monarchs